The 2000 African Judo Championships were the 22nd edition of the African Judo Championships, organised by the African Judo Union and were held in Algiers, Algeria 9–12 May 2000.

References

External links
 

African Judo Championships
African Championships
Judo
African Championships
May 2000 sports events in Africa